The Investigator: A British Crime Story is a British television crime documentary series, created and produced by Simon Cowell, and presented by Mark Williams-Thomas. The series, broadcast on ITV, is often described as "Britain's answer to Making a Murderer", and was inspired by Cowell's viewing of the documentary series The Jinx.

The first series, comprising four episodes, first broadcast in July and August 2016, focused on the murder of Carole Packman, who disappeared in 1985. The second series, comprising three episodes, first broadcast in April 2018 and looks into a number of unsolved disappearances and murders that could be linked to convicted serial killers Peter Tobin and Angus Sinclair.

The series also features a number of dramatised scenes filmed to portray key events in each of the cases featured, drawing inspiration from the reconstructive element of Crimewatch. The series was broadcast on Netflix internationally until the 21st August 2021.

Production
With help from fellow investigators, Williams-Thomas re-investigates each of the cases featured by speaking with relatives of the victims, eye-witnesses and police officers involved with the original investigation. Notably, Williams-Thomas' re-investigation of the Carole Packman murder unearthed enough significant new information to warrant Dorset Police to re-open the case and appoint a new SIO to undertake a full review.

Similarly, in the second series, Williams-Thomas' interviewed eyewitnesses involved with the cases of three women whom police suspect Angus Sinclair may have murdered, and for the first time, following new evidence uncovered by Williams-Thomas, multiple witnesses were able to place Sinclair's vehicle at the scenes of crime.

Cast
 Mark Williams-Thomas as Himself

Series 1 (2016)
 Rick Warden as Russell Causley
 Tanya Winsor as Carole Packman
 Frances Millar as Patricia Causley
 Alice Harding as Sam Gillingham
 Jason Allen as DC Paul Donnell
 David France as Anthony Hackett-Jones

Series 2 (2018)
 David Bannerman as Peter Tobin
 Billy Machin as Young Peter Tobin
 Polly Lewis as Margaret Moutney
 Eve Perry as Louise Kay
 Danielle Bird as Jessie Earl

Episodes

Series 1 (2016)

Series 2 (2018)

See also
Chris Clark, another investigative journalist who has created documentaries on unsolved crimes in the UK

References

External links
 

2010s British crime television series
2010s British documentary television series
2010s British television miniseries
2016 British television series debuts
English-language television shows
ITV crime shows
ITV documentaries
Television series by ITV Studios